Malcom Kyeyune (born 19 December 1987) is a Swedish writer and blogger. He writes for publications such as Aftonbladet, Fokus, Göteborgs-posten, Dagens Samhälle, UnHerd, The Bellows and American Affairs. He has a podcast together with Markus Allard of the municipal Örebro party, and frequently guests the podcasts Good ol' boyz and What's Left alongside Angela Nagle. He is part of the steering council for the conservative think tank Oikos headed by the politician Mattias Karlsson. Kyeyune was a member of the Swedish Young Left and chairman of its Uppsala district until 2014, at which point he was suspended as a result of conflicts within the Left party.

While sometimes being labeled by media as a conservative due to his participation in Oikos, Kyeyune primarily describes himself as a Marxist. He has argued for populism as a political doctrine, which he defines as the notion that "a country where the will of the people steers the agenda will be a country which is just and well-functioning" and that one must "believe in regular people, in workers", even if such a position implies that he, a Marxist, joins ranks with "people such as Jimmie Åkesson or Paula Bieler".

References

External links
 Power and Politics, tinkzorg, Kyeyune's blog (in Swedish and English)
 Compact, Articles by Malcom Kyeyune written for Compact Magazine (English)

 Unherd, Articles by Malcom Kyeyune written for Unherd (English)
 The Bellows, Articles by Malcom Kyeyune written for The Bellows (English)
 American Affairs, Articles by Malcom Kyeyune written for American Affairs (English)
 Kvartal, Articles by Malcom Kyeyune written for Kvartal (Swedish)

Living people
1987 births
Swedish bloggers

Swedish communists
21st-century Swedish people